{{Infobox professional wrestler
|name        = El Felino
|image       = Felino (cropped).jpg
|image_size  =
|alt         =
|caption     = El Felino in 2017
|birthname   = Jorge Luis Casas Ruiz
|birth_date  = 
|birth_place = Mexico City, Mexico
|death_date  =
|death_place =
|parents   =Pepe Casas (father)
|spouse     =Princesa Blanca
|children    =  
|family      = Casas
|names       = 
|height      =  "El Felino" (Spanish for "The Feline") character. As El Felino he wore an orange mask with black tiger stripes as well as an orange full body suit to match the mask design. On July 5, 1992, El Felino defeated Ciclón Ramírez to win the Mexican National Welterweight Championship. The match was part of a longer running storyline between the two. Felino vacated the title after winning the CMLL World Welterweight Championship on July 16, 1992. He lost the championship to Ciclón Ramírez on May 21, 1993, as part of their ongoing feud. The storyline between the two led to a mask vs. mask, Lucha de Apuestas, on July 9, which saw El Felino pin Ramírez, forcing him to remove his mask and state his name afterwards. Felino regained the CMLL World Welterweight March 30, 1994 in Acapulco, conclusively ending the storyline between the two as he defeated Ciclón Ramírez again.

His second reign came to an end on June 21, 1994, as he relinquished the championship to El Pantera II in Cuernavaca, Morelos. Near the end of 1994, El Felino won another mask, as he defeated Justiciero in a Lucha de Apuestas match in Guadalajara, Jalisco. Felino was teamed up with Emilio Charles Jr. for the 1995 Copa de Oro, held in honor of Oro who died during a match in 1993. The duo defeated Blue Demon Jr. and Silver King in the first round, the team of Máscara Mágica and Ringo Mendoza in the semi-finals before losing to Chicago Express and Pierroth Jr. in the finals. With his success in the welterweight division, El Felino was one of 16 wrestlers in a tournament to determine a new NWA World Welterweight Champion. He defeated Onita Jr. and Oro II to the semi-finals, where he lost at this stage to El Hijo del Santo to be eliminated from the tournament. In May of that year Máscara Mágica defeated El Felino in the finals of a tournament for the vacant CMLL World Welterweight Championship after Felino had first defeated Alacran de Durango, Ángel Azteca, and Ciclón Ramírez to advance to the finals.

In 1997, El Hijo del Santo began defending the WWA World Welterweight Championship in CMLL. On February 21 El Felino added another welterweight championship to his collection as he defeated El Hijo del Santo for the WWA title. El Hijo del Santo regained the championship on October 8, 1997, only for El Felino to win it a second time on January 31, 1998. The championship ended up being vacated after a match on March 8 ended without a conclusive winner. Four months later El Hijo del Santo claimed the title once more, when he defeated El Felino in the rematch.

Casas made his first trip to Japan in 1998 to work New Japan Pro-Wrestling's (NJPW) Best of the Super Juniors tournament. He ended up with just one point in the tournament, losing all but one match. 1998 also marked the year El Felino competed in the Leyenda de Plata ("Silver Legend") tournament, CMLL's most prestigious tournament at the time. He was eliminated by Scorpió Jr. early on. For the April 1999 Gran Alternativa tournament, El Felino teamed up with rookie Starman, but lost to Mr. Niebla and Atlantico in the opening round.

AAA (1999)
In 1999, after 10 years with CMLL, Jorge Casas left the company to work for their Mexican rival AAA. He, as El Felino, was introduced to the AAA audience as support for his younger brother Heavy Metal and their father as part of an ongoing storyline. His first mach for AAA took place on April 18, 1999, when he, Heavy Metal and Perro Aguayo Jr. defeated El Texano, Espectro Jr. and Sangre Chicana. The Casas storylined peaked at Triplemanía VII on June 11, 1999. In the semi-main event El Felino and Heavy Metal defeated Kick Boxer and Thai Boxer in a match where Pepe Casas' hair was on the line if the Casas brothers had lost. As a result of the Casas' brothers victory, referee El Tirantes' hair was shaved off instead. By the end of the year El Felino left AAA, with his last match for the company taking place on October 17 that saw El Felino, Hator, La Parka Jr. and Path Finder defeating Los Vipers (Abismo Negro and Electroshock), El Hijo del Espectro and El Hijo del Solitario.

Consejo Mundial de Lucha Libre (1999–current)
After his short stay with AAA, El Felino worked his first match back for CMLL on October 22, only five days after his last match for AAA. In December, El Felino teamed up with rookie Tigre Blanco (who had a similar "wild cat" character) for the Gran Alternativa tournament. The duo defeated Fugaz and Scorpio Jr. in the first round, then Ricky Marvin and Ringo Mendoza in the semi-finals and finally Máscara Año 2000 and Sangre Azteca in the finals to win the entire tournament.

Felino won the CMLL World Welterweight Championship for the third time with a victory over Nosawa on September 21, 2001, in Mexico City. On July 26, 2002, El Felino and Black Tiger survived a 16-man torneo cibernetico elimination match as the first stage of the Leyenda de Plata tournament. The following week El Felino defeated Black Tiger to earn his way to the finals of the tournament. In the end, El Felino defeated Black Warrior to win the Leyenda de Plata trophy. His third CMLL World Welterweight Championship reign lasted more than two years, ended by El Satánico on November 25, 2003, in Mexico City. On December 5, 2003, Felino, Volador Jr. and Safari won the vacant Mexican National Trios Championship by defeating  Alan Stone, Super Crazy and Zumbido in the finals of a tournament. At the 2004 Homenaje a Dos Leyendas ("Homage to two legends") show, El Felino, Safari and Volador Jr. successfully defended the Mexican National Trios Championship against Olímpico, Super Crazy and Zumbido. The Mexican National Trios Championship reign lasted 476 days, as they lost the championship on March 25, 2005, to Dr. X, Nitro and Sangre Azteca.

Through CMLL's working relationship with International Wrestling Revolution Group (IWRG), El Felino had worked for the group on special occasions over the years, but began working for them on a regular basis in 2005. First he formed a group called Los Revolucionarios with Black Dragon and Matrix, but soon began working with his brothers instead. On August 25, 2005, the Casas brothers defeated La Corporacion  (Black Tiger, Pentagon Black, and Pantera) to win the IWRG Intercontinental Trios Championship. The Casas' brothers trios championship reign in IWRG lasted 133 days, until Cerebro Negro, Veneno and Scorpio Jr. won it from them. Later in 2006, El Felino teamed up with longtime rival Pantera to win the IWRG Intercontinental Tag Team Championship on June 29, 2006, as they defeated Los Cerebros (Cerebro Negro and Dr. Cerebro). They would hold the title into 2007, losing to Los Junior Dinamitas (El Hijo de Cien Caras and Máscara Año 2000 Jr.).

La Peste Negra (2008–2020)

In July 2008 Mr. Niebla returned to CMLL, forming a group with Negro Casas and Heavy Metal called La Peste Negra (Spanish for "the Black Plague), a Rudo group that had a more comical approach to wrestling. The trio started wearing large afro wigs, painting their faces black and dancing during their entrances and generally worked a less serious style of match than was unusual, especially for a serious wrestler like Negro Casas. On September 2, 2008, the last Casas brother, El Felino turned Rudo as well and joined La Peste Negra. After Felino joined the group Heavy Metal was quietly phased out as he was not comfortable working the comedic style. Felino's wife Princesa Blanca joined the group in early 2009, turning Rudo to work with La Pestra, the turn led to Princesa Blanca winning the Mexican National Women's Championship from Marcela on January 30. La Pesta Negra's biggest triumph to date is Negro Casas' title win over Místico that brought the CMLL World Welterweight Championship into the group. After the title win, La Peste Negra continued their feud with Místico and his various allies. The feud led to Místico and Negro Casas facing off in a Lucha de Apuesta on the CMLL 76th Anniversary Show, where Casas lost two falls to one and had his hair shaved off. After the match Místico challenged El Felino, Casas' cornerman, to an Apuesta some time in the future although nothing came of it at the time.

In early 2010 El Felino began a storyline feud with La Sombra. The feud began on February 2, 2010, with a singles match between El Felino and La Sombra, after each wrestler won a fall, Puma King, El Felino's nephew, showed up wearing an El Felino outfit and mask, distracting both the referee and La Sombra long enough for El Felino to land a low blow on La Sombra to win the match. The two met in a Lighting match (a one fall, 10 minute time limit match) on the February 19 CMLL Super Viernes show. Once again Puma King tried to help his uncle, but this time the referee disqualified El Felino for the transgression. After the main event of the  show, Místico challenged Volador Jr. to a Lucha de Apuesta, or bet match, between the two with their masks on the line. During the main event La Sombra came to Volador Jr.'s aid while El Felino helped Místico.  On the February 26 Super Viernes show it was announced that Místico, Volador Jr., La Sombra and El Felino would face off in a four-way Lucha de Apuesta match as the main event of the 2010 Homenaje a Dos Leyendas. La Sombra was the first man pinned at Dos Leyendas and El Felino was the second, forcing the two to put their masks on the line. After a long match La Sombra pinned El Felino. After the match he unmasked and announced that his real name was Jorge Luis Casas Ruiz.

On September 30, 2011, at CMLL's 78th Anniversary Show, El Felino won Rey Bucanero's hair in a ten-man steel cage match. In October 2011, El Felino became one of four CMLL wrestlers featured in an A&E Latinoamericano documentary series titled El Luchador. In late 2011, El Felino began feuding with Blue Panther, which led to a Hair vs. Hair match on December 16 at Sin Piedad. A week prior to the show, Panther was disqualified in a tag team match, after giving El Felino a Martinete. This led to the Distrito Federal Box y Lucha Commission announcing that Panther was suspended for two weeks, starting after the December 16 event. At Sin Piedad, El Felino tried to exact revenge on Panther, but was disqualified after the referee caught him going for a Martinete. As a result, El Felino was shaved bald.

El Felino was teamed up with tecnico El Hijo del Fantasma for the 2013 Torneo Nacional de Parejas Increibles ("National Incredible Pairs Tournament"), a tag team tournament teaming rudos with technicos. The team lost to La Máscara and Averno in the first round despite Averno and La Máscara being long time rivals. On March 15, 2013, El Felino teamed up with his sons Tiger and Puma to defeat the team of Guerrero Maya Jr., Delta and Tritón in the opening match of the 2013 Homenaje a Dos Leyendas. On February 18, 2014, El Felino, Mr. Niebla and Negro Casas defeated La Máscara, Rush and Titán to win the Mexican National Trios Championship. They lost the title to Los Reyes de la Atlantida (Atlantis, Delta and Guerrero Maya Jr.) on April 26, 2015.

Felino, Casas and Mr. Niebla lost to the trio of Dragon Lee and Sky Team (Místico and Valiente) on the undercard of the CMLL 82nd Anniversary Show. In late 2015 into early 2016, El Felino became involved in a storyline feud with Super Crazy, a storyline that was split between CMLL and Lucha Libre Elite shows. The storyline led to Super Crazy defeating El Felino as in a Lucha de Apuestas match, forcing El Felino to be shaved bald. The rivals teamed up for the 2016 Torneo Nacional de Parejas Increíbles ("National Incredible teams tournament"), but they lost to Máscara Dorada and Boby Z in the first round. In November 2017, CMLL held a tournament for family teams called Copa Dinastia. Felino and his sons Tiger and Puma lost to Dragon Lee, Mistico and their father Comandante Pierroth. El Felino was one of 12 participants in the 2017 La Copa Junior VIP tournament, but was eliminated by Drago Lee.

El Felino participated in the 2018 Leyenda de Plata tournament, but was eliminated in the opening round when he was pinned by Soberano Jr. and became the ninth wrestler to be eliminated from the contest. For the 2019 Copa Dinastia, El Felino and Negro Casas faced and lost to Flyer and Volador Jr. in the opening round. El Felino was one of the wrestlers selected to work against Jushin Thunder Liger as Liger toured Mexico on his retirement tour, losing to Liger on a CMLL/Lucha Libre Real show on July 20, 2019. CMLL's working relationship with Ring of Honor (ROH) in the United States, allowed El Felino to work for ROH in August 2019, first teaming with Okumura and Silas Young to defeat The Shinobi Shadow Squad (Cheeseburger, Eli Isom and Ryan Nova), followed by a loss to The Bouncers (Brian Milonas and Beer City Bruiser) the following night as part of ROH's Honor for All supercard show.

Feud with Bárbaro Cavernario (2020–present)
On January 24, 2020, at La Noche de Mr. Niebla, Felino and Bárbaro Cavernario faced each other on opposite sides in a Relevos increíbles six-man tag team match between members of La Peste Negra. They would repeatedly attack each other throughout the match, which ended in a disqualification when Cavernario cheated to win the final fall over Felino. Afterwards, Felino hoped that La Peste Negra would continue, but Cavernario announced that, without Mr. Niebla, the stable should be disbanded, In the weeks that followed, Felino and Cavernario were involved in multiple confrontations (including at the Torneo Nacional de Parejas Increíbles final where Felino distracted Cavernario enough that he was pinned for the third and final fall), until they agreed on a hair vs. hair match at Homenaje a Dos Leyendas. The event had to be cancelled in the wake of the COVID-19 pandemic, and it would be rescheduled the following year. They continued the feud later that year during CMLL's empty arena shows. In 2021, they were paired together for the Torneo Nacional de Parejas Increíbles, but were defeated in the first round by Ángel de Oro and Mephisto. Cavernario was later challenged by Felino for the Mexican National Light Heavyweight Championship, which happened on June 29. Felino defeated Cavernario at the event, hitting him with a low blow, as the referee was dealing with Negro Casas; it was his first singles championship win since 2011. At Homenaje a Dos Leyendas, Felino was defeated by Cavernario in the hair vs. hair match. On October 5, Ángel de Oro challenged Felino for the Mexican National Light Heavyweight Championship. On October 12, Felino was defeated by Ángel de Oro, ending his reign at 105 days.

Championships and accomplishments
Consejo Mundial de Lucha Libre
CMLL World Welterweight Championship (3 times)
CMLL Torneo Gran Alternativa (December 1999) – with Tigre Blanco
Leyenda de Plata (2002)
Mexican National Light Heavyweight Championship (1 time)
Mexican National Welterweight Championship (1 time)
Mexican National Trios Championship (2 times) – with Volador Jr. and Safari (1),{{efn|name=MexTrios1|'Lucha 2000 (2004) p. 12, Numero 23 – Felino, Safari y Volador, Jr.	12 diciembre 2003 en Arena México [Eng: Number 23 – Felino, Safari and Volador, Jr.	December 12, 2003 in Arena México''] }} and Mr. Niebla and Negro Casas (1)
Occidente Light Heavyweight Championship (1 time)Distrito FederalDistrito Federal Trios Championship (1 time) – with Arkangel and Guerrero de la MuerteInternational Wrestling Revolution GroupIWRG Intercontinental Tag Team Championship (1 time) – with El Pantera
IWRG Intercontinental Trios Championship (1 time) - Negro Casas and Heavy MetalPro Wrestling IllustratedPWI ranked him # 58 of the 500 best singles wrestlers in the PWI 500 in 1999.Universal Wrestling AssociationNaucalpan Lightweight Championship (1 time)World Wrestling Association'''
WWA Welterweight Championship (2 times)

Luchas de Apuestas record

Notes

References

1964 births
Living people
Masked wrestlers
Mexican male professional wrestlers
Professional wrestlers from Mexico City
20th-century professional wrestlers
21st-century professional wrestlers
Mexican National Trios Champions
CMLL World Welterweight Champions